The 26th Senate of Puerto Rico is the upper house of the 18th Legislative Assembly of Puerto Rico. Its counterpart  in the lower house is the 30th House of Representatives of Puerto Rico.

The body will meet from January 2, 2017 to January 1, 2021 while under the oversight of the fiscal control board established by PROMESA.

But in contrast to its standard composition, the numbers of legislators in this senate increased to 30 after the New Progressive Party (PNP in Spanish) won more than two thirds of the original 27 seats in contention during the 2016 general election. This provision was automatically triggered by Article Three of the Constitution of Puerto Rico which mandates that in such a case the number of minority legislators should total 9.

Leadership

Members

Non-officers

Committees

! scope=col style="text-align: left" | Name
! scope=col style="text-align: left" | President
! scope=col style="text-align: left" | Vice President
! scope=col style="text-align: left" | Secretary
|-
| Agriculture
| Luis Berdiel Rivera
| José Perez Rosa
| Luis Daniel Muñiz
|-
| Appointments
| Thomas Rivera Schatz
| Carlos J. Rodríguez Mateo
| Luis Berdiel Rivera
|-
| Banking,Commerce and Cooperativism
| Eric Correa Rivera
| Zoé Laboy Alvarado
| Axel Roque
|-
| Consumer Affairs and Essential Public Services
| Evelyn Vázquez Nieves
| Luis Daniel Muñiz
| Henry Neumann Zayas
|-
| Development of Community Initiatives
| Vargas Vidot
| Nayda Venegas
| Eric Correa Rivera
|-
| Development of the South Central Region
| Nelson Cruz Santiago
| Luis Berdiel Rivera
| Evelyn Vázquez Nieves
|-
| Education and University Reform
| Abel Nazario
| Luis Daniel Muñiz
| Axel Roque
|-
| Electoral System of Puerto Rico
| Miguel Laureano
| Itzamar Peña Ramírez
| Henry Neumann Zayas
|-
| Environmental Health and Natural Resources
| Carlos J. Rodríguez Mateo
| Luis Berdiel Rivera
| Itzamar Peña Ramírez
|-
| Ethics and Public Integrity
| Ángel Chayanne Martínez
| Luis Berdiel Rivera
| Migdalia Padilla Alvelo
|-
| Federal Relations, Politics and Economics
| Thomas Rivera Schatz
| Miguel Romero
| Miguel Laureano
|-
| Government
| Carlos J. Rodríguez Mateo
| Migdalia Padilla Alvelo
| Evelyn Vázquez Nieves
|-
| Health
| Ángel Chayanne Martínez
| Carlos J. Rodríguez Mateo
| José Perez Rosa
|-
| Innovation, Telecommunication,Urbanism and Infrastructure
| Miguel Laureano
| Eric Correa Rivera
| Axel Roque
|-
| Internal Affairs
| Larry Seilhamer Rodríguez
| Eric Correa Rivera
| Margarita Nolasco Santiago
|-
| Municipal Matters
| Margarita Nolasco
| Itzamar Peña Ramírez
| Miguel Romero
|-
| Public Safety
| Henry Neumann Zayas
| Zoé Laboy Alvarado
| Luis Berdiel Rivera
|-
| Rules and Calendar
| Carmelo Ríos Santiago
| Axel Roque
| Carlos J. Rodríguez Mateo
|-
| Social and Economical Revitalization
| Zoé Laboy Alvarado
| Migdalia Padilla Alvelo
| Evelyn Vázquez Nieves
|-
| Social Welfare and Family Affairs
| Nayda Venegas
| José Perez Rosa
| Margarita Nolasco
|-
| Tourism and Culture
| José Perez Rosa
| Evelyn Vázquez Nieves
| Itzamar Peña Ramírez
|-
| Treasury
| Migdalia Padilla Alvelo
| Miguel Romero
| Eric Correa Rivera
|-
| Veterans' Affairs
| José Luis Dalmau
| Zoé Laboy Alvarado
| Carlos J. Rodríguez Mateo
|-
| Western Development
| Luis Daniel Muñiz
| Evelyn Vázquez Nieves
| Zoé Laboy Alvarado
|-
| Women's Affairs
| Itzamar Peña Ramírez
| Migdalia Padilla Alvelo
| Nayda Venegas
|-
| Youth, Recreation and Sports
| Axel Roque
| Henry Neumann Zayas
| Nelson Cruz Santiago
|-

Notes

References

2017 in Puerto Rico
26